Slub is an algorave group formed in 2000 by Adrian Ward and Alex McLean, joined by Dave Griffiths in 2005 and Alexandra Cardenas in 2017.  They are known for making their music exclusively from their own generative software, projecting their screens so their
audience can see their handmade interfaces.  Their music is improvised, and
advertised as falling within the ambient gabba genre.

Since 2005 slub performances have been exclusively live coded, using a variety of different self-built language
environments. Fluxus, a
Scheme game engine; and Tidal, a pure functional DSL embedded in Haskell.

In 2011, while on the way to a gig, Alex McLean and Nick Collins invented the Algorave.

References

External links
 slub official homepage

British experimental musical groups
British electronic music groups
British techno music groups
Live coding
Algorave